Kankakee Township is one of twenty-one townships in LaPorte County, Indiana. As of the 2010 census, its population was 4,830 and it contained 1,859 housing units.

The first settlements were made in Kankakee Township in the 1830s. The northeast corner of LaPorte, Indiana, is located within the southwestern corner of the township.

Geography

References

External links
 Indiana Township Association
 United Township Association of Indiana

Townships in LaPorte County, Indiana
Townships in Indiana
1830s establishments in Indiana